Occide Jeanty (1860–1936) was a Haitian composer, trumpeter, pianist and music director.

Biography
Occide Jeanty was born in 1860 in Port-au-Prince He was educated at Alexandre Pétion High School in Port-au-Prince. His father, Occilius Jeanty (1830–1882), was both director of the Central School of Music in Port-au-Prince, professor of mathematics at Alexandre Pétion High School, and director of the Military Music Corps attached to the National Palace.

After attending music classes at his father's Central School of Music, he obtained a scholarship to study at Paris with Jean-Baptiste Arban and Antoine François Marmontel .

In 1885, back in Haiti, the Haitian President, Lysius Salomon, appointed him on recommendation to the National Palace's Military Music Corps.

He composes mainly for the National Palace. 

In 1915, during the occupation of Haiti by American forces, he left the army with the rank of general. He became a music teacher at Alexandre Pétion High School in Port-au-Prince.

In 1922, he was recalled by the president Louis Borno. He became the conductor of the National Guard until his death in 1936.

He had about twenty children, including Lydia Occide Jeanty, Haiti's first female minister. He also had Pauline, Quetsia, Dieudonne, Zita and Carl-Henry Jeanty.

Works 
Occide Jeanty composed eight military marches for the National Palace.

He also composed six funeral song for Haitian dignitaries and their families, including:
Imprécations pour Dessalines, pour la commémoration de la mort de Jean-Jacques Dessalines.
Cher Hyppolite, pour la mort de Florvil Hyppolite
Nos l'armes, également pour Florvil Hyppolite
Ti Sam, pour Tirésias Simon Sam 
Sur la tombe pour Nord Alexis

He also composed four patriotic song, among which:
Quand nos Aïeux brisèrent leurs entraves (ou Chant national), avec les paroles d'Oswald Durand.
1804. 

He also composed polkas (Pauvres et pauvres en 1901), gavottes and méringues (Zizipan).

References
 Dominque-Rene De Lerma. "Black Composers in Europe: A Works List." Black Music Research Journal. Vol 10, No. 2. pg. 307

External links 
 Biographie d'Occide Jeanty
 Occide Jeanty et la musique haïtienne
 Cliché photographique d'Occide Jeanty avec l'orchestre de la Garde nationale d'Haïti

Haitian composers
1860 births
1936 deaths
Male composers
19th-century composers
20th-century composers
20th-century male musicians
19th-century male musicians